Haya Maraachli is a Syrian actress.

References

External links 
 

Syrian television actresses
People from Damascus
Living people
21st-century Syrian actresses
Syrian people of Lebanese descent
Year of birth missing (living people)